Joseph Christoffel Hoagland (June 19, 1841 – December 8, 1899, Manhattan) was the first president of the Royal Baking Powder Company.

Biography
The family began in the Americas with a Dutch settler to New Amsterdam, Dirck Jansen Hoogland, who arrived in 1657. He married Annetje Hans Bergen, the daughter of Hans Hansen Bergen and Sarah Rapalje. (Sarah Rapelje was born in Fort Orange (now Albany) 1625 to Joris Jansen Rapalje [1604-1662] and Catalyntje Trico [1605-1689]. Sarah’s parents had come over from Holland to New Netherland on the first ship to bring the first immigrants to New Netherland in 1624, and Sarah was the first woman of European descent born on the island of Manhattan.)

Joseph Christoffel Hoagland was born on June 19, 1841 in Ohio to Andrew Hoagland. He had a brother, Cornelius Nevius Hoagland (1828–1898).

In 1865, Joseph Hoagland married  Caroline C. Matlack, daughter of John Matlack of Dayton, Ohio.  They had three children, Raymond Hoagland (1866–1927), John A. Hoagland and Fanny L. Hoagland.

In 1866 Joseph Christoffel Hoagland, his brother Cornelius Nevius Hoagland and Thomas Biddle organized the Royal Chemical Company, which later became the Royal Baking Powder Company. In 1868 they moved to New York, where John H. Seal and William Ziegler became agents of the company and later shareholders.

Joseph C. Hoagland lived on Fifth Avenue, and worked at 171 Duane Street where he manufactured a brand that made millions of dollars.  A culinary revolution was started by the powder that made cake rise and gave it more flavour.  Hoagland excelled in marketing and branding their product with such logos such as "absolutely pure" that rendered it better advertised than other bakers.  By the close of 19th century Royal Baking Powder was on six continents, a truly international brand.  Hoagland was one of the "kings of New York" business world.
 
He had an acrimonious split with his business partner, William Ziegler in 1888.

Hoagland was a presidential elector in the 1880 presidential election.

Joseph C. Hoagland died on December 8, 1899.

His great great great granddaughter is Clare Balding, the BBC TV presenter, journalist and jockey.

References

1841 births
1899 deaths
Baking powder
19th-century American businesspeople

1880 United States presidential electors